Písařov is a municipality and village in Šumperk District in the Olomouc Region of the Czech Republic. It has about 700 inhabitants.

Administrative parts
The village of Bukovice is an administrative part of Písařov.

References

Villages in Šumperk District